Ulyankovo is a rural locality (a village) in Chushevitskoye Rural Settlement, Verkhovazhsky District, Vologda Oblast, Russia. The population was 24 as of 2002.

Geography 
Ulyankovo is located 47 km southwest of Verkhovazhye (the district's administrative centre) by road. Bereg is the nearest rural locality.

References 

Rural localities in Verkhovazhsky District